Vice Admiral Sanjeev Bhasin PVSM, AVSM, VSM,  is a retired Indian Navy officer.

Military career
He has commanded the Indian Navy ships ,  as well as INS Ranjit.

He was promoted to rear admiral on January 1, 2002 and served as Flag Officer Commanding Eastern Fleet.

In November 2006 he was promoted to the rank of Vice Admiral in November 2006 and was Deputy Chief of the Integrated Defence Staff at HQ Integrated Defence Staff from January 2007 before taking over as Commandant of the National Defence College in October 2007.

He is a graduate of the United States Naval War College and College of Naval Warfare.

He has been awarded the Vishisht Seva Medal in 2003 and the Ati Vishisht Seva Medal in 2006.

Military Decorations

References

Living people
Indian Navy admirals
Flag Officers Commanding Eastern Fleet
Naval War College alumni
Recipients of the Ati Vishisht Seva Medal
Recipients of the Vishisht Seva Medal
Year of birth missing (living people)
National Defence College, India alumni